Static World View is the first album by Spring Heeled Jack, released by Moon Ska Records on March 26, 1996.

By the time the band began recording the album, original trumpet player, Pat Gingras, had left and was replaced by Tyler Jones. Saxophone player, James Riley, also decided to leave the band and, as a result, half of the album features Riley playing saxophone, while the other half was recorded with new member, Pete Wasilewski, who had previously played alongside trombone player, Chris Rhodes, in the Connecticut band, JC Superska.

To support the release of the album, the band filmed their first music video for the song, "Pay Some Dues." The band also started touring outside of their usual local territory.

The album begins and ends with quotes from the movie Tapeheads.

Track listing
"One Way" (Karcich)  – 2:42
"Electric"  – 3:29
"Pay Some Dues" (Ragona)  – 2:54
"Running Man (Lookin' Thru the Mirror)" (Ragona)  – 3:36
"Rufus Shakeedoo" (Rhodes)  – 3:32
"All My Own" (Ragona, Pellegrino, Rhodes)  – 2:56
"Pigeon-Holed" (Ragona, Karcich, Pellegrino)  – 2:47
"Freedom" (Karcich, Spring Heeled Jack)  – 3:54
"Addicted" (Ragona, Pellegrino,)  – 3:35
"Peg Leg Bates" (Rhodes)  – 3:25
"Nervous" (Ragona, Karcich)  – 3:23
"Alicia Silverstone" (Aerosmith)  – 0:35
"Big Stone Cowboy" (Jones, Pellegrino, Rhodes)  – 2:16
"This Song (Has Probably Been Played Before)" (Ragona, Pellegrino, Omonte)  – 19:55

Personnel
 Tyler Jones - trumpet
 Dave Karcich - drums, backing vocals
 Rick Omonte - bass
 Mike Pellegrino - guitar, vocals
 Ron Ragona - guitar, vocals
 Chris Rhodes - trombone, arranger, vocals
 James Riley - sax (alto & tenor)
 Pete Wasilewski - sax (tenor)
 Ed Goldberg - engineer
 Basil Grabovsky - engineer, mastering, mixing
 Carl Osgood - producer, engineer, mastering, mixing
 Jeremy Brazeal - artwork

References

Static World View
Spring Heeled Jack U.S.A. albums